KSKY (660 AM) is a commercial radio station licensed to Balch Springs, Texas, and serving the Dallas/Fort Worth Metroplex.  It is owned by the Salem Media Group and broadcasts a conservative talk radio format.

KSKY broadcasts by day at 7,200 watts.  Because AM 660 is a clear channel frequency reserved for WFAN in New York City, KSKY must reduce power at night to 600 watts.  It uses a directional antenna at all times.  The transmitter is on Huffines Boulevard at Stonewall Drive in Lewisville, Texas.  Programming is also heard on three FM broadcast relay stations or translators:  92.9 KGPJ-LP in Dallas, 95.5 KRQP-LP in Arlington and 99.9 K260BP in Fort Worth.

Programming
KSKY airs mostly nationally syndicated conservative talk hosts on its weekday schedule.  One local program is heard in morning drive time, hosted by Mark Davis.  The rest of the line up includes Hugh Hewitt, Mike Gallagher, Dennis Prager, Eric Metaxas, Charlie Kirk, Jay Sekulow, Sebastian Gorka and This Morning, America's First News with Gordon Deal.

Weekends feature shows on money and health, some of which are paid brokered programming.  There are also repeats of weekday shows.  Most hours begin with world and national news from co-owned Townhall Radio News.

History
On September 28, 1941, KSKY first signed on.  It was owned by the Chilton Radio Corp.  In 1963, Chilton sold KSKY. Prior to the sale, it flipped to a Christian format, which aired until 2004 when it made the switch to conservative talk.

KSKY was sold to Salem in mid-2000.  KSKY was also originally a daytime-only station until the recent format change and city of license change from Dallas to Balch Springs. KSKY applied for an FM frequency at 106.9 in 1948, then turned down a chance to buy the 98.7 frequency in 1957, and was awarded 91.3 in the 1960s (but no proof that it ever signed on has ever been found, with 91.3 has become a part of the non-commercial band.)

During the station's early days, notables such as Jackie Gleason, Skitch Henderson, Vincent Price, Jane Russell, Jack Webb and Charlton Heston visited the station in person and performed live on KSKY.

Salem Media announced on May 29, 2012, that KSKY would be rebranded as The Answer, with the return of radio personality Mark Davis (previously on WBAP). Salem Communications Corporation’s Director of Spoken Word Format Phil Boyce explained the reason for the rebranding: “This station will truly be an answer for so many things going on in the Metroplex and the world, with smart hosts who know how to help you understand all of those things, not to mention great news, traffic, weather, and information.”

On January 1, 2014, KSKY began airing the Sean Hannity show 2–5 pm CT, in a move also from crosstown WBAP.

References

External links
 660 Am The Answer Homepage
  DFW Radio/TV History
  DFW Radio Archives

  STA Information
  STA Information
 FCC History Cards for KSKY

News and talk radio stations in the United States
Conservative talk radio
Radio stations established in 1941
1941 establishments in Texas
SKY
Salem Media Group properties